The Thief of Bagdad is a 1940 British Technicolor historical fantasy film, produced by Alexander Korda and directed by Michael Powell, Ludwig Berger and Tim Whelan, with additional contributions by William Cameron Menzies and Korda brothers Vincent and Zoltán. The film stars teen actor Sabu, Conrad Veidt, John Justin, and June Duprez. It was released in the US and the UK by United Artists.

Although produced by Alexander Korda's company London Films in London, the film was completed in California due to the outbreak of World War II.

Georges Périnal, credited as George Perinal, won the Academy Award for Cinematography, Vincent Korda for Art Direction, and Lawrence W. Butler and Jack Whitney for Special Effects (marking the first use of the "manual bluescreen technique"). Miklós Rózsa was also nominated for Original Music Score, a first for a British film at the Academy Awards.

Although this production is a remake of the 1924 version, the two films have differences, the most significant being that the thief and the prince are separate characters in this version. The screenplay is by Lajos Biro and Miles Malleson, who also appears in the film as the Princess's father, the Sultan of Basra.

Plot
In ancient Basra, a blind, young beggar begins telling the film's story in flashback (mimicking the style of the Arabian Nights), revealing that he is really Ahmad, the young, naive king of Bagdad. Wanting to know more about his people, Ahmad is tricked by Jaffar, his evil Grand Vizier, into going in disguise into the city. Jaffar then has him arrested and usurps the throne. In prison, Ahmad meets the young thief Abu, who arranges their escape. They flee to Basra, where Ahmad meets and falls in love with the Princess. Jaffar, however, also journeys to Basra, intent on having the Princess for himself.

Jaffar, a powerful sorcerer, provides the toy-obsessed Sultan of Basra with a mechanical flying horse in exchange for the promise of marriage to his daughter. The Princess, now in love with Ahmad, runs away, but Jaffar put a spell on Ahmad and Abu, blinding the former and turning the latter into a dog. She is captured for the slave market and is bought by Jaffar's agent. At the palace, though, she falls into a deep sleep and cannot be awakened. Halima, Jaffar's minion, tricks Ahmad into awakening the Princess. He is then dismissed with the dog to the city's docks, where he concludes his story.

The Princess is tricked into boarding a ship. Jaffar tells her that she can cure Ahmad's blindness only by allowing Jaffar to embrace her. She submits and the spells are lifted from both Ahmad and Abu. Jaffar prevents the two from following him by raising a storm that shipwrecks them. Returning to Basra, Jaffar uses a mechanical dancer to kill the Princess's father. He then returns to Bagdad with the Princess.

Abu awakes on a deserted beach. He finds a bottle and opens it, releasing an enormous genie so embittered by his long imprisonment he announces he will kill the boy.  Abu tricks the genie into submitting to him and granting him three wishes. The first wish is wasted, but the genie helps Abu to steal a magical jewel that enables him to find and reunite with Ahmad. With the jewel, Ahmad sees Jaffar using his magic to make the Princess forget her true love. Despondent, Ahmad quarrels with Abu, who inadvertently uses his third wish to send Ahmad back to Bagdad.

In Bagdad, Ahmad is reunited with the Princess, who remembers him. They are imprisoned by Jaffar and condemned to death. Abu helplessly witnesses all this with the jewel's aid. In anger, he destroys the jewel, which frees the "Old King" of the "Land of Legend."  Abu is given a magic crossbow as a reward. He steals the king's magic carpet and flies on it to Bagdad. Abu's appearance fulfills an ancient prophecy and sparks a revolt against Jaffar by the city's inhabitants. Abu kills the fleeing Jaffar with the crossbow. Ahmad is restored to power. Abu, alarmed by Ahmad's plans to educate him to become the vizier, flies off on the carpet in search of fun and adventure.

Cast
 Conrad Veidt as Jaffar
 Sabu as Abu
 June Duprez as the Princess
 John Justin as Ahmad
 Rex Ingram as the Djinn
 Miles Malleson as the Sultan of Basra
 Morton Selten as the Old King
 Mary Morris as Halima, Jaffar's agent, and the "Silver Maid"
 Bruce Winston as the Merchant
 Hay Petrie as the Astrologer
 Adelaide Hall as the Singer
 Roy Emerton as the Jailor
 Allan Jeayes as the Story Teller
 Robert Greig as Man of Basra (uncredited)
 Glynis Johns as Maid of the Princess (uncredited)
Duprez's character is unnamed; she is simply referred to as "The Princess", and addressed as "Princess", "my dear", etc.

Korda had intended to cast Vivien Leigh as the Princess, but she went to Hollywood to be with Laurence Olivier.

Production
Producer Alexander Korda, after a search for a director, chose German filmmaker Ludwig Berger in early 1939, but by the early summer became dissatisfied with Berger's overall conception of the movie—feeling it was too small-scale and intimate—and, specifically, the score that Berger proposed to use. Essentially behind Berger's back, British director Michael Powell was brought in to shoot various scenes—and Powell's scheduled work grew in amount and importance while, in the meantime, Korda himself did his best to undercut Berger on his own set; and while publicly siding with Berger on the issue of the music, he also undercut Berger's chosen composer (Oscar Straus) by bringing in Miklos Rozsa and putting him into an office directly adjacent to Berger's with a piano, to work on a score. Eventually, Berger was persuaded to walk away from the project, and American filmmaker Tim Whelan, who had just finished work on another Korda-produced movie (Q Planes) was brought in to help augment Powell's work. However, work was suspended with the outbreak of the Second World War in September 1939, for Powell was taken off the picture and put to work on the morale-boosting documentary The Lion Has Wings.

By the end of the year, Korda found himself running out of money and credit, and in the spring of 1940 he arranged to move the entire production to Hollywood (where some shots of the movie's young star Sabu had to be redone, for he had grown more than  during the year since shooting had commenced). Powell remained in England, so direction was taken up in Hollywood by Menzies and Zoltan Korda during the summer of 1940—including shots of the heroes in the Grand Canyon, Monument Valley, Bryce Canyon and the Painted Desert; the scenes in the Temple of the Goddess of Light, among the last to be written, were done late in the summer, and the film was being edited and re-structured into the fall of 1940.

At some point during production, the film was being written as a musical. The finished film has three songs, but others were written, with recordings of some surviving, including one verse of Rex Ingram singing a song written for the genie.

The film is notable for being the first film Peter R. Hunt worked on, serving as an associate editor at 15 years old. Hunt would go on to work on six James Bond films, including directing 1969's On Her Majesty's Secret Service.

Reception

The film was Korda's most successful in the US. The film was also a success in Europe, selling 5,135,145 tickets in France and becoming the seventh-most-attended film of the year.

The New York Times reviewer Bosley Crowther enthused that the film "ranks next to Fantasia as the most beguiling and wondrous film of this troubled season". Crowther praised "its truly magnificent color" and the performances of all five main actors.

Roger Ebert added The Thief of Bagdad to his "Great Movies" list, calling it "on a level with The Wizard of Oz". According to Ebert, "it maintains a consistent spirit, and that spirit is one of headlong joy in storytelling". He praised the performances of Sabu and Veidt ("perfectly pitched to the needs of the screenplay"), though he was less impressed with the chemistry between Duprez and Justin ("rather bloodless").

While its 1924 predecessor holds a 96% "fresh" rating from the review aggregator website Rotten Tomatoes, the 1940 Thief of Bagdad has a 100% rating based on 29 reviews, with an average score of 8.70/10. Its consensus states, "Dashing, dazzling, and altogether magical, The Thief of Bagdad is an enchanting fantasy for children of all ages".

Influence
The film has been highly influential on later movies based on The Book of One Thousand and One Nights setting. For example, the Disney film Aladdin borrows freely from it, particularly the characters of the evil vizier and the sultan, both drawn with a marked similarity to the characters in The Thief of Bagdad. The villain Jafar is named after the character played by Conrad Veidt, himself named after the historical vizier Ja'far ibn Yahya, who served Harun ar-Rashid. Like the sultan of the earlier film, Disney's Sultan is obsessed with toys. The thieving monkey Abu in the Disney cartoon is based on the boy played by Sabu. Richard Williams, speaking about his film The Thief and the Cobbler, said that one of his interests was in creating an Oriental fantasy that did not copy from it. The Prince of Persia video game franchise also shares similar characteristics with the film.

Larry Butler invented the first proper chroma key process for the special effects scenes in this film, a variation on the existing "traveling matte" process. This technique has since become the standard process for separating screen elements and/or actors from their backgrounds and placing them on new backgrounds for special effects purposes, and has since been used in thousands of films.

This film later influenced the creation of the Malay film Abu Hassan Penchuri ("Abu Hassan the Thief", 1955) which was based in Baghdad.

Home media
The film was released on VHS by The Samuel Goldwyn Company. The film was released on DVD by MGM in 2002. The Criterion Collection released a two-disc DVD release in 2008 that includes a commentary track by filmmakers Martin Scorsese and Francis Ford Coppola, who are both longtime fans of the film (their comments were recorded separately and then edited together).

It has been released on Region B–locked Blu-rays in Germany (Anolis Entertainment, 2012) and the UK (Network Distributing, 2015). The UK disc also includes image galleries and the original theatrical trailer. The German disc features the same extras, plus additional trailers, an audio commentary and a 53-minute documentary on the film's star, Sabu.

See also
 List of films with a 100% rating on Rotten Tomatoes, a film review aggregator website

References

Bibliography

 
 The Great British Films, pp 55–58, Jerry Vermilye, 1978, Citadel Press,

Further reading

External links

 
 
 
 
 Reviews and articles at the Powell & Pressburger Pages
 The Making of the Thief of Bagdad
 
 The Thief of Bagdad: Arabian Fantasies an essay by Andrew Moor at the Criterion Collection

1940 films
1940s fantasy adventure films
British fantasy adventure films
Films shot at Denham Film Studios
1940s English-language films
British epic films
Films by Powell and Pressburger
Films directed by Michael Powell
Films directed by Tim Whelan
Films directed by William Cameron Menzies 
Films set in Baghdad
Films that won the Best Visual Effects Academy Award
Films whose art director won the Best Art Direction Academy Award
Films whose cinematographer won the Best Cinematography Academy Award
London Films films
Films based on The Thief of Bagdad
Genies in film
Works based on Aladdin
Sound film remakes of silent films
Films scored by Miklós Rózsa
British remakes of American films
Films produced by Alexander Korda
Epic fantasy films
Films shot in Utah
Films based on fairy tales
1940s British films